The Albion-class ships of the line were a class of five 74-gun third rates, designed for the Royal Navy by Sir Thomas Slade.

Design
Slade based the design of the Albion-class on the lines of the 90-gun ship .

Ships

Builder: Deptford Dockyard
Ordered: 1 December 1759
Launched: 16 May 1763
Fate: Wrecked, 1797

Builder: Deptford Dockyard
Ordered: 22 October 1767
Launched: 26 September 1771
Fate: Broken up, 1816

Builder: Deptford Dockyard
Ordered: 21 August 1774
Launched: 30 July 1779
Fate: Broken up, 1817

Builder: Randall, Rotherhithe
Ordered: 2 February 1778
Launched: 23 March 1780
Fate: Broken up, 1820

Builder: Barnard, Harwich
Ordered: 8 July 1778
Launched: 6 December 1782
Fate: Broken up, 1806

References

Lavery, Brian (2003) The Ship of the Line - Volume 1: The development of the battlefleet 1650-1850. Conway Maritime Press. .

 
Ship of the line classes